Yeşilyuva (former Kayser) is a belde (town) in Denizli Province, Turkey

Geography 
Yeşilyuva is a town in Acıpayam district of Denizli Province.

History 
The area around Yeşilyuva was inhabited during the ancient ages by Luvians, Arzawa, Hitites, and Lydians. The ruins of Roman town Diokasareia (Keretapa) are near  the town. But the present town was founded in 13th century by a Turkmen tribe of Çelebi, soon after the area was incorporated into Seljuk realm. Two of the earliest settlers were Semarkandi Baba (from Semerkand, modern Uzbekistan)  and Ahi Kayser, an Ahi, specialized on tannery. Hence the town was named Kayser. The town flourished in shoe making and in 1381 it was captured by the Ottoman Empire.  In 1871 it was declared a seat of district (a subunit of the province).  But Kayser residents opposed public servants appointed to work in district offices and upon their request the administrative status of the town was reduced to that of township in 1908. The town was renamed as Yeşilyuva in 1925.

Economy
Yeşilyuva residents are expert shoe makers. Up to 1986, the shoes were produced in home shops. After the construction of  industrial complex of the town the production figures are on the rise. Presently the production averages 3,000,000 pairs a year.  Other economic activities (like grape farming) are only of minor importance

References

Towns in Turkey
Villages in Acıpayam District